Henri Dropsy (21 January 1885 – 2 November 1969) was a French sculptor and medallist. He is the son of Emile Dropsy. His work was part of the art competitions at the 1924 Summer Olympics and the 1928 Summer Olympics.

References

1885 births
1969 deaths
19th-century French sculptors
20th-century French sculptors
French male sculptors
Olympic competitors in art competitions
Sculptors from Paris
19th-century French male artists